The Jokes is a 2004 Italian anthology comedy film written and directed by Carlo Vanzina.

Plot 
The film is divided into many small episodes: various characters represent the typical vices and comedy of Italian society (especially Rome) early 2000. These characters are ruled by the King of Jokes, in Paradise, which is commissioned by San Gennaro who promise them eternal life.

Cast  
  
Gigi Proietti as  God / Waiter / Mexican Singer / Farmer / Lawyer and his client / Conductor
Enzo Salvi as  Enzo / Sandro / Grandma / Client at Bar
Carlo Buccirosso as Mr. Rossi / Maniac 
Fichi d'India as Cactuses /  Aliens / Maz & Max / Mothers / Firefighters 
 Biagio Izzo as Doorman / Man in the sauna / Gay man / Italian prisoner / Mafiaman
 Max Giusti as  Mario  
 Vito as  Traffic cop / Postman
 Éva Henger
Marco Messeri as  Surgeon
 Chiara Noschese as  Mario's wife
 Simona Guarino as Rossi's wife
Lorenzo Flaherty as Nobleman
Paolo Seganti as  Pirate
Gianfranco Barra

See also 
 List of Italian films of 2004

References

External links

2004 comedy films
2004 films
Italian comedy films
Films directed by Carlo Vanzina
Italian anthology films
2000s Italian-language films